Hello...x, is the second album by Californian singer-songwriter Tristan Prettyman. It was released in the UK on January 30, 2008, and in the US on April 15 by Virgin Records America.

Track listing
All songs written by Tristan Prettyman unless otherwise indicated.

"Hello"
"Echo"
"California Girl" (Prettyman, Sacha Skarbek, Martin Terefe)
"Madly" (Prettyman, Kevin Griffin)
"Blindfold"
"Handshake"
"War Out of Peace" (Prettyman, Skarbek, Terefe)
"You Got Me" (Prettyman, Skarbek, Terefe)
"Don't Work Yourself Up" (Prettyman, Skarbek, Terefe)
"Just a Little Bit" (Prettyman, Skarbek)
"Interviews" (Prettyman, Skarbek, Terefe)
"In Bloom"

Japanese bonus track
"God Gave Me Patience"
"Hummingbirds"

Personnel
Tristan Prettyman - acoustic guitar, vocals, cow bell
Sacha Skarbek - Rhodes, acoustic guitar, Wurlitzer, piano, keys
Luke Potashnick - guitars
Karl Brazil - drums, percussion
Macolm Moore - bass, piano
Nikolaj Torp - keys, Hammond, glockenspiel
Kensaltown Kings - claps

Chart positions

References

External links
Tristan Prettyman's Official Site
[ Tristan Prettyman Hello...x]

Tristan Prettyman albums
2008 albums